Adv. P.M.Ismail is an Indian politician who won the Muvattupuzha seat in the 2004 General Election after his opponent P. C. Thomas was disqualified by the Supreme Court.

Muvattupuzha

References

Members of the Kerala Legislative Assembly
Living people
Year of birth missing (living people)
People from Muvattupuzha